Mohammad Mostaghimi (born 23 December 1951) is an Iranian poet, writer, Literary critic, Researcher and Literary theorists. He started poetry at the age od 30.He is known as one of the pioneer poets of new Persian poetry in Isfahan.

Education

Early education 
Mostaghimi completed his early childhood education in the village of Chupanan in Isfahan Province. Then he went to Yazd to continue his education and could complete his secondary education.

Higher education 
He stopped studying the field of Mechanics when he was a student at Iran University of Science and Technology. He became interested in Persian literature and received his master's degree at the University of Isfahan.

References 

Living people
1951 births
Iranian male poets